The United Kingdom was represented in the Eurovision Song Contest 1982 by Bardo with the song "One Step Further". It was chosen as the British entry through the A Song for Europe national selection process and placed seventh at Eurovision, receiving 76 points.

Before Eurovision

A Song for Europe 1982
The television show A Song for Europe was used once again to select the British entry, as it had since the United Kingdom's debut at the Contest in 1957. Terry Wogan once again hosted the contest, which was held on 24 March in Studio 1 of Television Centre, London. Eight songs were shortlisted from those submitted to the Music Publishers Association. Bucks Fizz were guests at the show, singing their current single "My Camera Never Lies" in a pre-recorded performance. The group were interviewed by Terry Wogan live during the show and group member Bobby G performed backing vocals for the winning artists, Bardo. The BBC Concert Orchestra under the direction of Ronnie Hazlehurst as conductor accompanied all the songs, but despite performing live, the orchestra were off-screen, behind the set. The set itself gave a suggestion as to the main Eurovision stage in Harrogate which also used light columns and mirrors, in addition this set was partially recycled for the Doctor Who adventure Snakedance, broadcast almost a year later.

Paul Curtis planned to perform two of his three entries himself and recorded the two tracks for his forthcoming album. "Different Worlds, Different People" was to be performed by Curtis with a backing trio, but he opted not to sing the song himself due to the running order, and Bobby McVay sang the song in the competition with Samantha Spencer Lane and two other singers under the group name Lovin' Feeling. McVay returned to win the contest the following year as a member of Sweet Dreams. Curtis returned on several more occasions as a songwriter, winning the contest in 1984, 1990 and 1991. Curtis' third song was performed by family group The Weltons, who were the only act taking part in the 1982 final that had any prior performing or recording experience, having released several singles, including "Down at Shorty's Place", "Hang 10, Hang10", and "Sweet Rock 'n' Roller", although none of them had reached the UK singles chart, but they had been promoted on German television and radio. The quartet 'Good Looks' featured Lewis and Lavinia Rodgers, the brother and sister of former UK Eurovision entrant Clodagh Rodgers. Although formed for the competition to sing Dave Mindel's "Every Day of My Life", the group stayed together and recorded the closing theme song for Jim'll Fix It, also composed by Mindel. On one edition of that show, the group performed the song with a viewer who'd asked Jim to fix it for him to sing the song.

Bardo's victory meant that Sally-Ann Triplett became only the third singer to win the Song for Europe contest twice, having already won the 1980 contest as part of Prima Donna. (Cliff Richard had represented the UK twice in Eurovision, but did not participate in a contest to determine the British artist). Triplett remains the only artist to have participated multiple times to win the contest at all attempts.

The regional juries voted internally and awarded 15 points to their favourite song, 12 points to the second, 10 points to the third and then 9, 8, 7, 6 and 5 points in order of preference for the songs from 4th to 8th. The juries were based in Glasgow, Birmingham, Bristol, Belfast, London, Manchester and Cardiff.

UK Discography 
Q-Feel - Dancing in Heaven (Orbital Be-Bop): Jive JIVET7 (7" Single)/JIVETS7 (12" Single).
Paul Curtis - No Matter How I Try: RCA RCA215.
The Touring Company - Every Step Of The Way: Radioactive RAD504.
Lovin' Feeling - Different Worlds, Different People: Dazzle DAZS7.
Paul Curtis - Different Worlds, Different People: RCA PB9961.
Good Looks - Every Day Of My Life: Radioactive RAD503.
Rich Gypsy - You're The Only Good Thing In My Life: Splash/CBS A2290.
Bardo - One Step Further: Epic A2265.
The Weltons - How Long?: Carrere CAR233.

At Eurovision 
Since Bucks Fizz won the Contest in 1981, the 1982 Eurovision Song Contest was held in Harrogate and presented by Jan Leeming. The United Kingdom entered Bardo with "One Step Further", but it only gained 76 points and was positioned seventh over all, despite being in the top three for most of the point awarding. The winner of the Contest was Germany with Nicole's "Ein bißchen Frieden".

Voting

References 

1982
Countries in the Eurovision Song Contest 1982
Eurovision
Eurovision